Malesherbia paniculata is perennial subshrub native to the Atacama, Coquimbo, Valparaíso, Metropolitana, and O'Higgins regions of Chile. It can be found at elevations of up to 2600m to sea level. It was originally described in 1827 by D. Don.

Phenotypically, M. paniculata is extremely similar to sister species M. linearifolia. Though they are distinguishable by their leaves. Additionally, they differ in their species range.

References 

Rosids of Chile
Taxa named by David Don
paniculata
Plants described in 1827